Liquid Sex Decay is the eponymously titled and only studio album by Liquid Sex Decay, released in December 1997 by MJ-12 Records.

Reception 
Aiding & Abetting called Liquid Sex Decay "better than average" and "the results are generally good, though sometimes the final sound seems oddly lightweight." A critic at Black Monday called the compositions intriguing and said "LSD is fresh, fun and exciting, including ambient, industrial and electronic elements in dark trip into gorgeously textured imagery." Sonic Boom praised the musicians of Apparatus and commended them for revealing their artistic growth and moving away from guitar dominated compositions. Steven Cannon of Vibrations of Doom praised the diverse instrumentation and unusual gothic atmosphere.

Track listing

Personnel 
Adapted from the Liquid Sex Decay liner notes.

Liquid Sex Decay
 Scott Morgan (as Sid) – guitar, engineering
 David York (as D. York) – keyboards, engineering

Production and design
 Dave Harris – mastering
 Mary Lawing – cover art

Release history

References

External links 
 Liquid Sex Decay at Discogs (list of releases)

1997 debut albums